The Fuller's Head of the River Fours  (HOR4s) is a processional rowing race held annually on the Tideway of the River Thames in London on the  Championship Course from Mortlake to Putney.

History
The idea for a Tradesmen's Tideway Head Race for fours, was first mooted in the early 1950s by the Thames Amateur Rowing Association (the TARA).

After picking a date for the new race the TARA dropped their plans after learning that the Tradesmen's Rowing Clubs Association had also started to organise a similar open fours race.

Thus the fledgling "Head of the River 4s" was first raced in 1955. In the following years the race was known as the Tradesmen's Rowing Clubs' Association Head of the River Fours, though even at this stage ARA clubs were entering along with NARA and TRCA clubs.

In the late 1950s the ARA and NARA finally merged into the Amateur Rowing Association of Great Britain. The event then became known simply as the Head of the River Fours, and was handed over to a new Committee in 1963 after the TRCA's eventual amalgamation.

In the first race, 34 crews rowed over a three-mile course from Chiswick Steps to Putney Pier. The entry has grown steadily over the years and in 1988 the race was extended to the full four and a quarter mile Championship Course from Mortlake to Putney (i.e., the Oxford and Cambridge Boat Race course in reverse).

Since its inception, many changes have taken place to the race, including the course length and alterations. Most crew/boat categories with four rowers have been added. In particular the introduction of quads was in 1973 when there were just three entries. Women's crews first competed in the HOR4s in 1977 (when there were 20 entries) after the event merged with the Women's Rowing Committee Head of the River Fours. Lightweight events were added in 2008 but have since been discontinued due to lack of entries. In general, the race is over-subscribed and attracts entries from all over the United Kingdom and abroad.

Fuller, Smith and Turner began their sponsorship of the Race in 1979 and event winners are rewarded each year with excellent hospitality in the Hock Cellar at the Griffin Brewery in Chiswick, where the prizes are presented.

Events
The race currently provides 18 events for coxed fours, coxless fours and quadruple sculls in Club, Academic and School/Junior categories for open and women's crews. It is run by a committee of volunteers.

See also
Rowing on the River Thames
Head of the River Race – a similar race open to men's eights.
Women's Eights Head of the River Race

Notes and references
Notes 
  
References
 
Cleaver, Hylton, A History of Rowing
National Amateur Rowing Association, London Metropolitan Archives, Catalogue Ref. A/NAR

External links
 Head of The River Fours website

Mortlake, London
Rowing on the River Thames
Recurring sporting events established in 1955
Head races
Water sports in London
1955 establishments in England